Dr Paulo Vanualailai was a member of the Kiribati House of Assembly for the constituency of Rabi Island.

References

Year of birth missing (living people)
Living people
Members of the House of Assembly (Kiribati)
Pillars of Truth politicians